The 2007 Kilkenny Irish Masters was a professional non-ranking snooker tournament that took place between 9 and 11 March 2007 at the Ormonde Hotel in Kilkenny, Republic of Ireland.

Ronnie O'Sullivan won in the final 9–1 against Barry Hawkins to claim the Paul Hunter Trophy. In the quarter-finals O'Sullivan also compiled a maximum break against Joe Swail. The initial maximum break prize of a Citroën Coupe, worth €20,000, was later withdrawn by the organisers.


Prize fund
The breakdown of prize money for this year is shown below:
Winner: €20,000
Runner-up: €8,000
Semi-final: €3,500
Highest break: €2,000

Round-robin stage

Group A

 Gerard Greene 3–4 Michael Judge
 Gerard Greene 4–2 John Higgins	
 John Higgins 4–0 Michael Judge

Group B

 Fergal O'Brien 4–2 Stephen Lee
 Neil Robertson 4–1 Stephen Lee
 Neil Robertson 1–4 Fergal O'Brien

Group C

 Barry Hawkins 4–3 David Morris
 Jimmy White 2–4 Barry Hawkins
 David Morris 4–1 Jimmy White

Group D

 Matthew Stevens 2–4 Joe Delaney
 Joe Delaney 1–4 Joe Swail
 Joe Swail 4–2 Matthew Stevens

Knockout stage

Final

Century breaks

147, 138, 134, 122  Ronnie O'Sullivan
135  John Higgins
131, 107, 104  Barry Hawkins
109  Fergal O'Brien
103  David Morris
102  Joe Swail

References

Irish Masters
Irish Masters
Masters